Bruno Giacomelli (born 10 September 1952) is a retired racing driver from Italy.

He won one of the two 1976 British Formula 3 Championships and the  Formula Two championship. He participated in 82 Formula One Grands Prix, competing for the first time on 11 September 1977. He achieved 1 podium, and scored a total of 14 championship points.

Early career
Giacomelli began his career in Formula Italia, which he won in 1975. In 1976, he graduated to Formula Three where he competed with March and finished runner up in his first season, to Rupert Keegan, in the B.A.R.C Championship and won the B.R.D.C. title. He also led from start to finish in a March-Toyota in the 1976 Monaco Grand Prix Formula Three support race. His average speed was 74.84 miles per hour.

Giacomelli moved into Formula Two in 1977, working in close association with Robin Herd and the March factory. He retired from the Formula Two Pau Grand Prix in May 1977, after his car made contact with one driven by Jacques Laffite. However, he managed to score three F2 wins in 1977 (at Vallelunga, Mugello and Donington Park) and finished fifth in the championship. He also made his Formula One World Championship debut in 1977 in a third works McLaren M23-Cosworth at the 1977 Italian Grand Prix at Monza, retiring with an engine problem which caused him to spin off.

Giacomelli dominated the following F2 season. Apart from a third-place finish in the Mugello Grand Prix in May 1978 and a second-place in Vallelunga, Giacomelli won eight of the twelve races and won the title, beating the runner up Marc Surer by 29 points. Giacomelli became the first Italian to win the European Formula Two Championship.

Formula One

He achieved his best finish, of seventh place, in the 1978 British Grand Prix. Alfa only entered their 177 and 179 cars in a handful of events that year, and Giacomelli could only achieve a best of 17th place in the 1979 French Grand Prix.

However, the following year the team looked more promising. Giacomelli earned a surprise 6th place qualifying position for Alfa Romeo at Brands Hatch for the 1980 British Grand Prix. Giacomelli posted a third-place qualifying time for the 1980 Italian Grand Prix at Imola. Three of his six mechanics sustained injuries on the Friday before the race, when their helicopter crashed en route to the track. He won the pole position for the 1980 United States Grand Prix at Watkins Glen, New York in his Alfa Romeo. Giacomelli improved on his opening day time by 1.25 seconds, with a time of 1 minute 33.29 seconds over the 3.37 mile track. However, despite these flashes of speed Giacomelli only managed to finish three of the season's fourteen races due to crashes or mechanical breakdowns; although two of his finishes were fifth places at the season-opening 1980 Argentine Grand Prix and the 1980 German Grand Prix, thus netting him four points and placing him 16th in the Drivers' Championship.

In , the car was somewhat more reliable, with Giacomelli being a classified finisher in eight of the season's 15 races - however he struggled to achieve good results until the end of the year, with a fourth and a third in the season-ending Canadian and Caesars Palace Grands Prix respectively - the latter was Giacomelli's only podium finish in F1, and he achieved his best-ever championship finish by ending up 15th in the drivers' standings.

For 1982 Alfa introduced their new Alfa Romeo 182 to replace the ageing 179, however, the new chassis proved to be unreliable in the first half of the season. In the second half, it was reliable enough to allow Giacomelli to finish all but two of the races, however, the year only yielded one points finish for him, with a fifth in Germany. Giacomelli was eliminated at the start of the 1982 Belgian Grand Prix at Zolder when his Alfa Romeo collided with the two ATS cars of Eliseo Salazar and Manfred Winkelhock. Alfa recruited Mauro Baldi to partner Andrea de Cesaris for the 1983 Formula One season and Giacomelli joined Toleman. Giacomelli was outperformed by his teammate Derek Warwick, though he did manage to pick up a final F1 point at the  1983 European Grand Prix at Brands Hatch.

Giacomelli was the test driver for the Leyton House March team in 1988 and 1989, as well as in 1990 in its Leyton House incarnation. He was offered a test driver position with McLaren for 1990 but turned it down.

In 1990, Giacomelli returned to F1 with the Life outfit, taking over from Gary Brabham (who left the team two races into the season). The car, saddled with an ineffectual and fragile W12 engine, struggled to get within 20 seconds of the pole time at many circuits and Giacomelli failed to even get out of pre-qualifying at any of the 12 Grands Prix he contested with the team. At the Portuguese Grand Prix the team reverted to a more conventional Judd V8 engine, but the car had not been adapted for the new engine and the team were unable to properly fit the engine cover, leading to them pulling out of the event without completing a single lap. When Giacomelli was able to drive the Judd-powered car in Spain he found himself 18 seconds off the pace despite the new engine. With money in short supply and few hopes of improving their desperately noncompetitive package the team folded before the final two races of the season, ending Giacomelli's F1 career.

CART

He made 11 starts in CART in 1984 and 1985, 10 of which were for Patrick Racing. His best finish was a 5th place on the Meadowlands street course in 1985. He attempted but failed to qualify for the 1984 Indianapolis 500.

Racing record

Career summary

‡ Not eligible for Championship points.

Complete European Formula Two Championship results
(key) (Races in bold indicate pole position; races in italics indicate fastest lap)

Complete Formula One results
(key) (Races in bold indicate pole position)

Complete BMW M1 Procar results
(key)

Complete World Touring Car Championship results
(key) (Races in bold indicate pole position; races in italics indicate fastest lap)

American Open-Wheel racing
(key) (Races in bold indicate pole position)

CART PPG Indy Car World Series

Complete World Endurance/World Sports Protype Championship results
(key) (Races in bold indicate pole position) (Races in italics indicate fastest lap)

 Not eligible for Championship points

24 Hours of Le Mans results

References

1952 births
Living people
Sportspeople from the Province of Brescia
Italian racing drivers
Italian Formula One drivers
Alfa Romeo Formula One drivers
McLaren Formula One drivers
Toleman Formula One drivers
Life Racing Engines Formula One drivers
European Formula Two Championship drivers
British Formula Three Championship drivers
World Touring Car Championship drivers
Champ Car drivers
24 Hours of Le Mans drivers
World Sportscar Championship drivers